Natasja Vermeer (born 1973) is a Dutch model and actress. Vermeer is known for having been the star of the series of films Emmanuelle  The Private Collection between 2004 and 2006. Natasja is also a songwriter and singer, and personally took charge of recording two songs for the soundtrack of the films. She also appeared in the film Private Moments in 2005. Natasja is a defender of animal rights and posed naked against the use of fur thus promoting the 2008 campaign of  PETA Europe.

Filmography 
Emmanuelle The Private Collection: Emmanuelle Sex Goddess (2003)
Emmanuelle Private Collection: Emmanuelle vs. Dracula (2004)
Emmanuelle Private Collection: Sex Talk (2004)
Emmanuelle Private Collection: The Sex Lives Of Ghosts (2004)
Emmanuelle Private Collection: Sexual Spells (2004)
Private Moments (2005)
Emmanuelle Private Collection: The Art Of Ecstasy (2006)
Emmanuelle Private Collection: Jesse's Secrets Desires (2006)
Emmanuelle Tango (2006)
One Night in My Pants (2009)

References

External links 

Natasja Vermeer in Fashion Model Directory

1973 births
Living people
Dutch female models
Dutch film actresses
21st-century Dutch actresses
People from Enschede
21st-century Dutch singers
21st-century Dutch women singers